The Hundred of Kanmantoo is a cadastral unit of hundred in the eastern Adelaide Hills. One of the 10 hundreds of the County of Sturt, it was proclaimed on 13 November 1847 by Governor Frederick Robe and named after the Kanmantoo gold mine, itself presumed to be named after an indigenous term by William Giles.

Apart from the town of Kanmantoo the following towns and localities of the Mount Barker District Council are within (or partly within) the Hundred of Kanmantoo:
 Harrogate
 Brukunga
 Dawesley
 Nairne (most part)
 Hay Valley (most part)
 Mount Barker Summit (east half)
 Petwood
 Mount Barker Springs (east half)
 St Ives
 Callington (half west of Bremer River)
 Mount Torrens (south portion)

An eastern portion of Woodside (in the Adelaide Hills Council area) is also within the hundred, crossing the western border.

Local government
The District Council of Nairne was established in 1853, incorporating the Hundred of Kanmantoo as well as the Hundred of Monarto. Following the amalgamation of Nairne council into the new District Council of Mount Barker in 1935, the hundred has been a ward or wards within the latter.  the hundred is largely occupied by the North ward, with areas near the South Eastern Freeway falling into the Central ward.

See also
 Lands administrative divisions of South Australia

References

Kanmantoo
1847 establishments in Australia